This is a list of notables, mythological persons and deities on coins of Armenia.

Artaxiad Kingdom

Kingdom of Cilicia

Republic of Armenia

References
 Chester L. Krause and Clifford Mishler. Standard Catalog of World Coins. Iola, WI. 2002 Edition (20th Century), Pages 106, 108
 Coin Types from Armenia  Lists, pictures, and values of Armenian coin types

External links
 Coins of Cilicia
 Central Bank of Armenia

 
Armenia
Coins
Coins of Armenia